The 1972 United States presidential election in Wisconsin was held on November 7, 1972 as part of the 1972 United States presidential election. Incumbent President Richard Nixon won the state of Wisconsin with 53.40 percent of the vote, carrying the state's 11 electoral votes, although Wisconsin was the fifth most Democratic state during the election, voting 13.48 points more Democratic than the nation as a whole. In no other election since the emergence of the Republican Party has Wisconsin voted so much more Democratic than the country as a whole.

McGovern won seven counties (out of 131 county-equivalents including three in Alaska that he won nationally) receiving as usual his highest vote in almost wholly Native American Menominee County where he won 62.3 percent of the vote. McGovern and Shriver also achieved clear majorities in Milwaukee, Dane, Ashland, Douglas and Portage Counties, and Rusk County by 1.1 points. Nixon won Manitowoc County by one hundred and ten votes, achieved pluralities in Pepin, Chippewa and Forest Counties, and won majorities in the remaining seventy-eight – the largest being in Waupaca County where Nixon won by forty-two percentage points.

Nixon became the first Republican since Warren G. Harding in 1920 to win Iron County, and was the last Republican until Donald Trump in 2016 to win Pepin and Kenosha Counties, and remains the last Republican to claim Bayfield County.

Results

Results by county

See also
 United States presidential elections in Wisconsin

Notes

References

1972 Wisconsin elections
1972
Wisconsin